Rhetinolepis is a monotypic genus of flowering plants belonging to the family Asteraceae. The only species is Rhetinolepis lonadioides.

Its native range is Northwestern Africa.

References

Anthemideae
Monotypic Asteraceae genera